Lurah Bilut is a town in Bentong District, Pahang, Malaysia. It is the oldest estate town in the country and also a constituency of the Pahang State Legislative Assembly. It is located along Federal Route 8 en route to Raub. This estate town was established in 1960 by the Federal Land Development Authority (Felda).

The town has a Petronas gas station, bus station, and shops including a coffee shop which is more than 30 years old.

Town in popular culture

Songs
Cintaku Di Lurah Bilut - Faiz Akmal & The Band

Movies
Bilut (2006)

References

External links

Bentong District
Federal Land Development Authority settlements
Towns in Pahang